The men's freestyle 57 kg is a competition featured at the Golden Grand Prix Ivan Yarygin 2018, and was held in Krasnoyarsk, Russia on the 26th of January.

Medalists

Results
Legend
F — Won by fall
WO — Won by walkover (forfeit)

Final

Top half

qualification: Donduk-ool Khuresh-ool of Tuva def. Rasul Mashezov of Crimea (8-0)
qualification: Azamat Tuskaev of RNO-Alania def. Semen Vladimirov of Yakutia by TF, (12-0)
qualification: Azamat Tuskaev of RNO-Alania def. Tugs Batjargal of Mongolia by TF, (10-0)
qualification: Baris Kaya of Turkey def. Sezgin Pismisoglu of Turkey (6–4)

Section 1

Repechage

References

Men's freestyle 57 kg